The Fighting Roosevelts is a 1919 biographical film about Theodore Roosevelt. It is not known whether the film currently survives.

Cast
 Francis J. Noonan as Theodore Roosevelt (child)
 Herbert Bradshaw as Theodore Roosevelt (young adult)
 E.J. Ratcliffe as Theodore Roosevelt (president)

Production
During production, William Nigh received permission to access much of Theodore Roosevelt's personal possessions. This allowed the film to reveal new information about the former president. Roosevelt himself authorized the film with the hope that the film's earnings would go to "patriotic organizations", such as the Red Cross. He died one week later.

References

External links

1919 films
American silent feature films
American black-and-white films
1910s biographical films
American biographical films
Films directed by William Nigh
1910s American films